Inkerman is an unincorporated community in Hardy County, West Virginia, United States. Inkerman lies at the confluence of the North River and Skaggs Run.

References

Unincorporated communities in Hardy County, West Virginia
Unincorporated communities in West Virginia